The Friend is a weekly Quaker magazine published in London, UK. It is the only Quaker weekly in the world, and has been published continuously since 1843. It began as a monthly and in January 1892 became a weekly. It is one of the oldest continuously published publications in the world still in operation. Others (e.g. Punch) which began publication before The Friend have had lengthy interruptions in publication and/or have closed down.

Independence
The Friend is completely independent from Britain Yearly Meeting, although since 2004 it has occupied space in Friends House. It is owned by The Friend Publications Ltd., a trust which also publishes Friends Quarterly. The Trustees of The Friend are appointed from members of Britain Yearly Meeting.

The Trustees appoint the Editor who, along with the other members of staff, is entirely responsible for the day-to-day management of the magazine, and its content. Among the initial trustees were Josiah Forster, George Stacey, John Hodgkin.

Editorial policy
As an independent publication, The Friend is free to report critically on trends within Quakerism in Britain and around the world, and on the governance of Britain Yearly Meeting. It also reports on the activities of Friends and Friends' groups and it is a forum for theological debate. There is a great deal of opinion in the magazine, and the letters page provides a forum for readers to express their views.

One of the ways The Friend exercises its responsibility to give readers an independent viewpoint is by covering Meeting for Sufferings, the standing consultative body of Britain Yearly Meeting, which meets five times a year. Meeting for Sufferings often deals with controversial issues, on which The Friend reports and comments.

The Friend Online
In recent years, The Friend has begun offering all its content online to subscribers. It is intended to make the issues for the period 1914 to 1918 available as a digital archive.

The printing of The Friend
For many years, The Friend was printed by an old Quaker firm, Headley Brothers, of Ashford, Kent. Headley Brothers went into administration in 2017. From 23 June 2017 The Friend appears in full colour, printed by Warners Midland plc.

The Friend appears every Friday. It has .

In its entire history, The Friend has failed to appear twice, due to paper rationing during the Second World War.

Between 1892 and some time after 1931, the magazine was printed by The Orphans Press, Leominster

List of Editors
The main source for this list is an annotated typescript held at Friends House Library, Euston, UK
1843-1849 Charles Tylor
1849-1852 Joseph Barrett 
1852-1857 Edward Newman, "under the guidance of Charles Gilpin, the proprietor".
1858-1859 Alfred William Bennett
1859-1871 John Frank 
1872-1875 Joshua Rowntree
1875-1878 John Stephenson Rowntree
1878-1891 Joseph Stickney Sewell 
1892-1912 Henry Stanley Newman, assisted by E. B. Reynolds
1912-1931 Edward Bassett Reynolds. 
1932-1949 Hubert William Peet 
1950-1965 Bernard Hall Canter 
1966-1973 Clifford Haig
1974-1990 David Firth
1990-1993 Sally Juniper
1993-1997 Deborah Padfield 
1997-2004 Harry Albright
September 2004 - April 2010 Judy Kirby
April 2010 - November 2018    Ian Kirk-Smith 
January 2019 onward - Joseph Jones

See also
The Family Friend (magazine), published in London from 1849 to 1921

References

External links
The Friend online
The Friend as a source for genealogical research

Religious magazines published in the United Kingdom
Weekly magazines published in the United Kingdom
Christian magazines
Magazines published in London
Magazines established in 1842
Quaker organizations
Quakerism in the United Kingdom
Monthly magazines published in the United Kingdom